Al-Khalidiyyah is a subject of Baladiyah al-Batha and a residential neighborhood south of Sinaiyah Qadeem and west of al-Faisaliyyah that emerged between the 1950s and 1970s in southern Riyadh, Saudi Arabia. It is inhabited mostly by overseas Indian, Pakistani, Bangladeshi and Yemeni migrant workers and their families.

Spanned across 3.82 square kilometers, it's bordered between Ali Ibn Abi Talib Road to the east, Al Kharj Road to the west and Southern Ring Road to the south. The locality is also known for serving several schools and health centers for nearby districts besides being unpopular among residents for its seasonal power outages. Al Khalidiya Park is also located in the south-most of the neighborhood. Since the late 1980s, the High Commission for the Development of Riyadh has implemented a series of projects in the neighborhood in order to reduce the groundwater levels

References 

Neighbourhoods in Riyadh